Monarchs of the British Isles may refer to monarchs within any of the following:
 List of English Monarchs
 Monarchy of Ireland
 Monarchs of Scotland
 List of British monarchs
 Monarchy of the United Kingdom